Nocardioides soli  is a Gram-positive, rod-shaped, carbendazim-degrading and motile bacterium from the genus Nocardioides.

References

External links
Type strain of Nocardioides soli at BacDive -  the Bacterial Diversity Metadatabase

soli
Bacteria described in 2014